Ray Stevens (born 1939) is an American country music and pop singer-songwriter.

Ray or Raymond Stevens may also refer to:

Ray Stevens (badminton) (born 1951), English badminton player
Ray Stevens (politician) (born 1953), Australian politician
Ray Stevens (wrestler) (1935–1996), American professional wrestler
Ray Stevens, co-developer of the Code 39 barcode specification
Raymond Stevens (judoka) (born 1963), English judoka
Raymond C. Stevens (born 1963), American structural biologist
Raymond Bartlett Stevens (1874–1942), U.S. Representative from New Hampshire

See also
Ray Stephens (baseball) (born 1962), baseball catcher
Ray Stephens (singer) (1954–1990), lead singer in the disco group Village People
E. Ray Stevens (1869–1930), Justice of the Wisconsin Supreme Court and Wisconsin State Assemblyman